Ismael Mafra Cabral (7 February 1938 – 15 January 2009), simply known as Ismael, was a Brazilian footballer who played as a right back.

Honours
Santos
Intercontinental Cup: 1962, 1963
Copa Libertadores: 1963
Taça Brasil: 1962, 1963, 1964
Torneio Rio – São Paulo: 1963
Campeonato Paulista: 1964

References

1938 births
2009 deaths
Footballers from São Paulo (state)
Brazilian footballers
Association football defenders
Sociedade Esportiva Palmeiras players
Esporte Clube XV de Novembro (Piracicaba) players
Associação Ferroviária de Esportes players
Santos FC players
Fluminense FC players
São Paulo FC players
Coritiba Foot Ball Club players